Ombretta Fumagalli Carulli (5 March 1944 – 16 March 2021) was an Italian politician, jurist, and academic.

Biography
Carulli earned a law degree from the Università Cattolica del Sacro Cuore in 1966. In 1975, she became the first female chairperson of canon law and subsequently ecclesiastical law. In 1981, she was elected to the High Council of the Judiciary, where she served until 1986 and presided over Executive Appointments Committee and founded the Anti-Mafia Committee.

Carulli began her political career in 1987, when she was elected to the Chamber of Deputies as a member of the Christian Democracy party. She was re-elected to the Palazzo Montecitorio and subsequently served in the Ciampi Cabinet. In 1994, she joined Pier Ferdinando Casini's Christian Democratic Centre and was part of the Forza Italia coalition. She also became the Undersecretary to the Presidency of the Council for Civil Protection under the Berlusconi I Cabinet.

In 1996, Carulli was elected to the Senate and joined the center-right Pole for Freedoms coalition, but joined the liberal-centrist Italian Renewal, led by Lamberto Dini, in 1997. In 1999, she became Undersecretary to the Ministry of the Interior under the D'Alema II Cabinet, which was dissolved on 26 April 2000. She then became Undersecretary to the Ministry of Health under the Amato II Cabinet. She left politics in 2001 and did not seek reelection to the Senate.

She returned to the Università Cattolica del Sacro Cuore following her political career, teaching ecclesiastical and canon law. She authored several hundred academic, religious, and social publications. In 2003, she was nominated by Pope John Paul II to join the Pontifical Academy of Social Sciences. Although she was no longer publicly involved with politics, she joined the Union of the Centre.

In 2012, Carulli became President of the Christian Democrats, led by Gianni Fontana.

Ombretta Fumagalli Carulli died in Milan on 16 March 2021 at the age of 77.

References

1944 births
2021 deaths
Deputies of Legislature X of Italy
Deputies of Legislature XI of Italy
Deputies of Legislature XII of Italy
Members of the Italian Senate
20th-century Italian women politicians
21st-century Italian women politicians
20th-century Italian judges
Italian women judges
20th-century women judges
Christian Democracy (Italy) politicians
Università Cattolica del Sacro Cuore alumni
Academic staff of the Università Cattolica del Sacro Cuore
People from the Province of Monza e Brianza
Women members of the Chamber of Deputies (Italy)